Rizal Avenue, also known as Avenida or Avenida Rizal, is one of Manila's main thoroughfares running from its Santa Cruz and Quiapo districts to the Bonifacio Monument (Monumento) Circle in Caloocan. Named after the national hero José Rizal, it is a part of Radial Road 9 (R-9). The LRT Line 1 elevated railroad is built above the street in its entire length, and several jeepneys ply the area taking passengers from Caloocan, Quezon City, and Valenzuela. Most of the street is within Santa Cruz, Manila. By the 1960s, economic activities shifted from Binondo to Makati. The avenue forms part of National Route 150 (N150) of the Philippine highway network.

Contemporary landmarks
The LRT Line 1 stations are the main landmarks of the avenue; there are nine of them at Rizal Avenue.

At the northern end of the avenue is the Bonifacio Monument roundabout. Vehicles coming from Rizal Avenue's northbound carriageway can turn right into EDSA (Circumferential Road 4); its northern logical extension would be the MacArthur Highway (Manila North Road; continuation of Radial Road 9), which leads all the way to Laoag, Ilocos Norte. Vehicles from Samson Road (EDSA's logical western extension) enter the avenue to its southbound carriageway.

The avenue also provides access to the entrance and exit gates of the Manila Chinese Cemetery. The San Lazaro Compound (which hosts the San Lazaro Hospital, the Jose R. Reyes Memorial Medical Center and the Department of Health) and the Archdiocesan Shrine of Espiritu Santo are the other landmarks along the avenue.

Shopping malls found along the Avenue are Araneta Square, Uniwide Sales, SM City San Lazaro (a walking distance from Tayuman Street) and at the south end at Carriedo Street is the Isetann Carriedo. In front of Isetann is Plaza Lacson. One passing through Plaza Lacson ends up in MacArthur Bridge, then to Taft Avenue (Radial Road 2). Eastbound takes one to Quiapo Church, although this part of the street has been pedestrianized.

History
The Avenida Rizal was created by Manila city ordinance in 1911 from two parallel streets – Calle Dulumbayan (from dulo ng bayan, meaning "the edge of town") and Calle Salcedo. The road was lengthened in the next two decades all the way up to Caloocan, then a municipality in Rizal, and the then-new monument honoring Andres Bonifacio, now known as Monumento. It occupied the old Calle Cervantes in Santa Cruz, Manila. The extension was originally referred to as Manuguit Extension and Rizal Avenue Extension's name had also reached further north up to Polo, Bulacan (now Valenzuela, Metro Manila). The avenue was designated as Route 3A and a part of Manila North Road (Highway 3 or Route 3). It became the city's longest street before being overshadowed by EDSA later in the century. Prior to and right after World War II, the avenue was center of the city's social life, with the street lined with shops, restaurants and movie theaters. The theaters were designed by the prominent architects of the day, many of whom would become National Artists. It was also one of the right-of-way alignments of tranvia, which existed until 1945.

Two National Artists for architecture, Pablo Antonio and Juan Nakpil, created several of the movie theaters along the avenue. Antonio designed the Galaxy, the Ideal, the Scala and the Lyric theaters, while Nakpil designed the Capitol, the Ever and the Avenue theaters. As the years went by, the area was victimized by urban renewal.

By the 1960s, economic activities shifted from the downtown area of Manila to Makati. The exodus of business and the rich residents from Manila to the suburbs coupled by the increase in low skilled rural migrants looking for work opportunities led to the deterioration of the old business districts, including Rizal Avenue. The construction of LRT Line 1 in the 1980s, which required the closure of Rizal Avenue to vehicular traffic, essentially killed business along the route. The cinemas themselves resorted to showing double feature B-movies and soft porn, as people transferred to the newer and more modern Ortigas Center and the Ayala Center.

In 2000, during the mayorship of Lito Atienza, the stretch from C.M. Recto Avenue to Palanca Street was turned into a pedestrian-only thoroughfare by laying bricks on the road, with the buildings and the Line 1 painted as part of an urban renewal project. This caused vehicles to use the secondary roads such as Tomas Mapua and Doroteo Jose Streets in order to go to and from Plaza Lacson. The Ideal Theater was previously demolished, the Galaxy, Scala and Lyric theaters are now misused. The first level of the Ever Theater is occupied by stalls, while the upper levels are abandoned. Only the refurbished Capitol Theater, now a dimsum palace, survived the modern times and is still active. The pedestrianization of Rizal Avenue was completed on 2003 and was meant to only last for a short time but it has persisted until 2008.

The Avenue Theater, which survived the Battle of Manila of 1945, was demolished in 2006 to give way to a parking area. The costs of maintaining the facility were too high, as compared for it to be converted as a parking area. The National Historical Institute (NHI) and several private entities tried to prevent the building from being torn down.

One of Mayor Alfredo Lim's first decisions after winning the elections of 2007 was to reopen the pedestrian-only section of Rizal Avenue, which has elicited complaints from shopkeepers due to decreased traffic of people, and from commuters which caused traffic jams on secondary streets. Since the cost of the tiles for the pedestrianization was about  each, the tiles had been carefully removed for it to be used in future projects. On July 17, 2007, Lim attended the ceremony reopening the closed portion of Rizal Avenue, and it has remained open to this day.

Train stations along Rizal Avenue
All are LRT Line 1 stations, from north to south:
Monumento
5th Avenue
R. Papa
Abad Santos
Blumentritt
Tayuman
Bambang
Doroteo Jose
Carriedo

In addition, LRT Line 2 crosses the avenue at C.M. Recto Avenue, and the Recto station is a short walk away from the avenue. The Philippine National Railways also crosses Rizal Avenue Extension, with Blumentritt railway station also a short walk away.

Intersections

Other roads named after Rizal 
"Rizal Avenue" and its variations thereof such as "Rizal Street" are one of the most common street names in the Philippines. It usually serves as the main street of a town or city, and in cases towns and cities in the Luzon mainland, the street that leads to Manila is "Rizal Street". J.P. Rizal Avenue in Makati, Rizal Avenue in Olongapo, and some segments part of the Pan-Philippine Highway are some of such streets.

See also 
Standalone movie theaters of the Philippines
Tondo, Manila
Quiapo, Manila
University Belt

References

Streets in Manila
Santa Cruz, Manila